The flag of Valdivia is a red saltire (crux decussata or X-cross) on a white field. It is thought to have originated from the Spanish cross of Burgundy, as the city of Valdivia in southern Chile was a very important stronghold of the Spanish Empire. It is equal to the international maritime signal flag for the letter V and the meaning "I require assistance".

External links
Flags of the World

Los Ríos Region
Flags of Chile
Flags with crosses